Mark Harper (born November 5, 1961 in Memphis, Tennessee) is a former American football cornerback in the National Football League. He was signed by the Cleveland Browns as an undrafted free agent in 1986. He played college football at Alcorn State.

1961 births
Living people
American football cornerbacks
American football safeties
Alcorn State Braves football players
Cleveland Browns players
Ed Block Courage Award recipients